Daniel Richard McBride (born December 29, 1976) is an American actor, comedian, screenwriter and producer. He starred in the HBO television series Eastbound & Down, Vice Principals, and The Righteous Gemstones, also co-creating the former two with frequent collaborator Jody Hill while creating the latter himself. He has appeared in films such as The Foot Fist Way (2006), Hot Rod (2007), Pineapple Express (2008), Tropic Thunder (2008), Up in the Air (2009), Your Highness (2011), This Is the End (2013), and Alien: Covenant (2017). He has done voice acting for Despicable Me (2010), Kung Fu Panda 2 (2011), Hell and Back (2015), The Angry Birds Movie, Sausage Party (both 2016), The Angry Birds Movie 2 (2019), and The Mitchells vs. the Machines (2021).

Early life
McBride was born on December 29, 1976, in Statesboro, Georgia. His mother, Kathy Rudy, and his stepfather both work at Marine Corps Base Quantico, as civilian support. McBride has Irish, Scottish, English and Jewish ancestry; with Catholic ancestors from Ulster who emigrated to Virginia in the 1870s. He was raised Baptist, and has said, "church was very much part of my life when I was a kid. My parents were really involved and went all the time." His mother performed sermons in church using puppets, and McBride stated that his "interest in telling stories comes from her." He was raised in Spotsylvania County, Virginia, where he graduated from Courtland High School and attended University of North Carolina School of the Arts in Winston-Salem, North Carolina, and became one of the "Three Flavas" along with director Jody Hill and Kris Baucom.

Career
McBride made his acting debut in 2003, playing a supporting role in his college friend David Gordon Green's second feature film All the Real Girls.

In 2006, McBride played Fred Simmons in the low-budget comedy film The Foot Fist Way, which he co-wrote with collaborators Jody Hill and Ben Best. He appeared in character as Simmons to promote the film on Late Night with Conan O'Brien on February 26, 2008. He wrote and starred in the HBO original comedy series Eastbound & Down (also a collaboration with Hill and Best), as Kenny Powers, a washed-up former major league baseball pitcher with anger management issues. The series was produced by Gary Sanchez Productions, and the pilot episode premiered on February 15, 2009, featuring Will Ferrell and Craig Robinson.

On April 8, 2009, HBO announced it had renewed the series for a second season. On July 2, 2012, HBO renewed the series for a fourth season. The series ended on November 17, 2013. In March 2009, because of his role as Powers, he received an offer to play semi-professional baseball for the Pensacola Pelicans, a team in the American Association of Independent Professional Baseball.

In 2010, he signed an endorsement deal with K-Swiss shoes and played the eponymous roadie in the Tenacious D music video for "Roadie" in 2012. McBride co-starred in the HBO comedy series Vice Principals from 2016 to 2017.

McBride provided the voice for Duane Earl, a fictional talk radio host in the 2013 video game Grand Theft Auto V. Earl, the owner of the Blaine County Radio station, is the host of Beyond Insemination, a segment where Earl (McBride) converses with callers.

In 2017 McBride appeared in Alien: Covenant directed by Ridley Scott starring alongside Katherine Waterston, Michael Fassbender and Billy Crudup. McBride told Vanity Fair in an interview that he was both surprised and glad for the opportunity to be involved with the Alien movie since he had been a longtime fan of the franchise.

In January 2018, two trailers were released online for what was supposedly a Crocodile Dundee sequel, titled Dundee: The Son of a Legend Returns Home. The film was said to star McBride as Brian Dundee, the son of the original Crocodile Dundee. The trailers feature cameo appearances by Australian actors Chris Hemsworth, Hugh Jackman, Russell Crowe, Margot Robbie, and Ruby Rose. From the beginning, various aspects of the campaign made some publications believe that film was an elaborate hoax. It was later reported that these ads were actually part of a lead up to a Super Bowl commercial for Tourism Australia.

McBride and David Gordon Green co-wrote the script for Halloween, the 2018 sequel to Halloween (1978). The film was directed by Green, executive produced by series creator John Carpenter, and produced by Jason Blum.

Since 2018 McBride has been the face of bookmaker Coral's television commercials in the United Kingdom, playing a character called "Sports Rodstein", described as "the world's biggest sports fan (although not the savviest)".

In late 2018, HBO ordered The Righteous Gemstones, a new show from McBride and his Rough House Pictures label, straight to series. The show, a comedy co-starring McBride, John Goodman, Adam Devine, and Edi Patterson is centered on a world-famous televangelist family with a long tradition of deviance, greed and charitable work.

In 2021, McBride provided the voice of Rick Mitchell in the Sony Pictures Animation film The Mitchells vs. the Machines.

Personal life
McBride has been married to art director Gia Ruiz since October 15, 2010. They have a son and a daughter. He lives with his family in Charleston, South Carolina.

Filmography

Film

Executive producer only

Television

Music videos

Video games

References

External links

 

1976 births
Living people
20th-century American comedians
20th-century American male actors
20th-century American male writers
20th-century American screenwriters
21st-century American comedians
21st-century American male actors
21st-century American male writers
21st-century American screenwriters
American male comedians
American male film actors
American male screenwriters
American male television actors
American male television writers
American male voice actors
American people of English descent
American people of Irish descent
American people of Jewish descent
American people of Scottish descent
American stand-up comedians
American television writers
Male actors from Virginia
People from Spotsylvania County, Virginia
Screenwriters from Virginia
Showrunners
University of North Carolina School of the Arts alumni
Television producers from Virginia